Satun may refer to
the town Satun
Satun Province
Mueang Satun district
Kingdom of Setul

See also
Satan